Eshkol National Park is a national park located in Northern Negev, Israel, near Gaza.

History

The 875-acre park offers lawns and shaded picnic areas and boasts at its centre the largest spring in the Nahal Besor/Wadi Ghazzeh basin, known in Hebrew as Ein HaBesor and in Arabic as Ein Shellal. The spring taps the near-surface aquifer, which is fed by the runoff of winter rains.

East of the springs, the mound of Khirbet Shellal dominates the landscape. At Shellal ANZAC troops discovered during the World War I Second Battle of Gaza an elaborate floor mosaic depicting a variety of animals, part of the ruins of a Byzantine church. The mosaic is now displayed in the Australian War Memorial in Canberra. Shellal is located some 3 km northeast, and across the valley of Nahal Besor/Wadi Ghazzeh, from the more famous biblical archaeological site of Tell el-Farah (South).

See also
Tourism in Israel

References

External links
 Jewish National Fund, Eshkol National Park (Besor).
 Jewish National Fund, The ANZAC Trail: From the Be'eri Badlands to Beersheba.
 Paul Daley, a detailed rendering of how the Shellal Mosaic was found and removed
 Victoria University of Wellington, The New Zealanders in Sinai and Palestine: The Shellal Mosaic

National parks of Israel
Commemoration of Levi Eshkol